Humphrey is an unincorporated community in Clark County, Idaho, United States.

History
Humphrey's population was 25 in 1960.

References

Unincorporated communities in Clark County, Idaho
Unincorporated communities in Idaho